The 39th Massachusetts General Court, consisting of the Massachusetts Senate and the Massachusetts House of Representatives, met in 1818 and 1819 during the governorship of John Brooks. John Phillips served as president of the Senate and Timothy Bigelow served as speaker of the House.

Senators

Representatives

See also
 15th United States Congress
 16th United States Congress
 List of Massachusetts General Courts

References

External links
 . (Includes data for state senate and house elections in 1818)
 
 

Political history of Massachusetts
Massachusetts legislative sessions
massachusetts
1818 in Massachusetts
massachusetts
1819 in Massachusetts